Asia (AD) Durr (born April 5, 1997) is an American professional basketball player for the Atlanta Dream of the Women's National Basketball Association (WNBA). They played  college basketball for the Louisville Cardinals.

College career
After the 2017–18 season, Durr was named the ACC Player of the Year. Durr received 29 of 31 votes for pre-season All-American, prior to the 2018–19 season. Durr finished their career at Louisville with career averages of 17.8 points, 2.2 assists, and 3.2 rebounds.

Louisville statistics

Source

Professional career

New York Liberty

Rookie season (2019)
Durr was drafted by the New York Liberty as the 2nd overall pick in the 2019 WNBA draft. They made their debut on May 24, 2019 against the Indiana Fever, scoring 8 points in 25 minutes of playing time. They played in 18 games in their rookie season, averaging 9.7 points in 26.7 minutes per game.

COVID-19 sidelining (2020–2021)
They missed the entire 2020 season due to coronavirus. Preceding the start of the 2021 WNBA season, Durr was ruled out for the season due to continued struggles with effects from COVID-19. They were placed on the full-season suspended list as a result.

Return to the Liberty and WNBA (2022)
On May 7, 2022, in what was the first game of New York Liberty's 2022 season, AD returned to the WNBA court, tallying 5.75 minutes off the bench in a victory over the Connecticut Sun. AD struggled to get minutes in their return to the Liberty, only averaging 7 minutes in 10 games. On June 8, 2022, they were traded to the Atlanta Dream.

Atlanta Dream
AD was traded to the Dream on June 8, 2022, in exchange for Megan Walker and the draft rights to Raquel Carrera.

WNBA career statistics

Regular season

|-
| align="left"| 2019
| align="left"| New York
| 18 || 15 || 26.7 || .467 || .294 || .818 || 1.6 || 1.7 || 0.6 || 0.4 || 1.2 || 9.7
|-
| align="left"| 2022
| align="left"| New York
| 10 || 0 || 7.0 || .176 || .111 || .875 || 0.1 || 0.4 || 0.4 || 0.2 || 0.5 || 1.4
|-
| align="left"| 2022
| align="left"| Atlanta
| 15 || 2 || 19.9 || .422 || .458 || .774 || 1.9 || 1.7 || 0.3 || 0.1 || 1.1 || 10.7
|- 
| align="left"| Career
| align="left"| 2 years, 2 teams
| 43 || 17 || 19.7 || .431 || .352 || .803 || 1.4 || 1.4 || 0.4 || 0.3 || 1.0 || 8.1

Notes

References

External links

Louisville Cardinals bio

1997 births
Living people
All-American college women's basketball players
American women's basketball players
Basketball players from Georgia (U.S. state)
Guards (basketball)
LGBT basketball players
LGBT people from Georgia (U.S. state)
Lesbian sportswomen
Louisville Cardinals women's basketball players
McDonald's High School All-Americans
New York Liberty draft picks
New York Liberty players
People from Douglasville, Georgia
Sportspeople from the Atlanta metropolitan area